= Kondaiah =

Kondaiah or Kondayya (Telugu: కొండయ్య) is one of the Indian names.

- Kairam Kondaiah, Chief Justice of Andhra Pradesh High Court
- K. Kondaiah, MLC, Amalapuram, ex-MP, ex -Speaker (Lok Sabha & Rajya Sabha)
